Dame Susan Jowett  is a British education advisor and former chief executive officer. In the 2016 New Year Honours, she was appointed a Dame Commander of the Order of the British Empire, for services to education.

References

Year of birth missing (living people)
Living people
British educators
Dames Commander of the Order of the British Empire